The grand master of the Knights Templar was the supreme commander of the holy order, starting with founder Hugues de Payens in 1118. Some held the office for life while others resigned life in monasteries or diplomacy. Grand masters often led their knights into battle on the front line and the numerous occupational hazards of battle made some tenures very short.

Each country had its own master, and the masters reported to the grand master. He oversaw all of the operations of the order, including both the military operations in the Holy Land and Eastern Europe, and the financial and business dealings in the order's infrastructure of Western Europe. The grand master controlled the actions of the order but he was expected to act the same way as the rest of the knights. After Pope Innocent II issued the bull Omne datum optimum on behalf of the Templars in 1139, the grand master was obliged to answer only to him.

List of grand masters

Notes

Footnotes

References

See also
 List of Knights Templar
 Grand master (order)
 List of grand masters of the Knights Hospitaller
 Grand Masters and Lieutenancies of the Order of the Holy Sepulchre
 Grand Master of the Teutonic Order
 Grand Masters of the Order of Saint Lazarus

Bibliography
 

 
Knights Templar,Grand Masters
Templar